Daniel St George Chatto (born Daniel Chatto St George Sproule; 22 April 1957) is a British artist and former actor. He is the husband of Lady Sarah Chatto, the daughter of Princess Margaret, Countess of Snowdon, niece of Queen Elizabeth II and cousin of King Charles III.

Biography
Daniel was born on 22 April 1957 in London, England, as "Daniel Chatto St George Sproule". He is the son of Thomas Chatto St George Sproule (1920–1982), better known as the actor Tom Chatto, and his wife, Rosalind Joan Thompson (died 2012), better known as the theatrical agent Ros Chatto. He has an elder brother, James Chatto, a food writer in Toronto who is the father of comedian Mae Martin.

In 1987, he legally changed his name by a deed poll from Daniel Chatto St George Sproule to Daniel St George Chatto. At the same time, his mother, also using a deed poll, abandoned her married surname of Sproule in favour of Chatto.

Marriage
On 14 July 1994, Chatto married Lady Sarah Armstrong-Jones.

The couple have two sons:
 Samuel David Benedict Chatto (born 28 July 1996) who is 28th in the line of succession to the British throne as of September 2022. He studied at Eton, read History of Art at the University of Edinburgh, and now works as a sculptor, based in West Sussex.
 Arthur Robert Nathaniel Chatto (born 5 February 1999) who is 29th in the line of succession to the British throne and a former page of honour to Queen Elizabeth II (his grand-aunt) from 2009 to 2015. He also attended Eton and the University of Edinburgh, and worked as a personal trainer. As of June 2022, he is serving with the Royal Marines.

Filmography
The Marquise (1980, TV film) as Miguel
Quartet (1981, directed by James Ivory) as Guy
Priest of Love (1981) as Aquitania Officer
To the Manor Born (series finale, 1981) as Heatherington-Poole
Nancy Astor (1982; based on the life of Nancy Astor) as Billy Grenfell
Charles & Diana: A Royal Love Story (1982, TV film) as Prince Andrew
A Shocking Accident (1982, Short) as Paul
Juliet Bravo (1983, TV series) as Billy Braithwaite
Heat and Dust (1983, by James Ivory, based on a novel by Ruth Prawer Jhabvala) as Party Guest
The Razor's Edge (1984; based on a novel by Somerset Maugham) as Wounded French Soldier #1
A Christmas Carol (1984, TV movie, based on a novel by Charles Dickens) as William
The Shooting Party (1985) as John
Dutch Girls (1985, TV movie) as Fforde
The Death of the Heart (1985, TV film, based on a novel by Elizabeth Bowen) as Eddie
Little Dorrit (1987; based on a novel by Charles Dickens) as Tip Dorrit (final film role)

References

External links

1957 births
Living people
British male film actors
British male television actors
Daniel
Place of birth missing (living people)